Cinemart is a Czech film company founded in 1992 as Lucernafilm. It changed to its current name in 1995. Cinemart was a minor film distributor with only 1% share on the market. It changed when Cinemart took over US partners of Bontonfilm becoming one of largest film distribution companies in the Czech Republic.

As of 2020 Cinemart holds 25% market share being the largest Czech film distributor.

Films

Czech

References

External links

Entertainment companies established in 1992
Mass media companies established in 1992
Czech film companies
Entertainment companies of the Czech Republic